The 1998 IAAF Grand Prix Final was the fourteenth edition of the season-ending competition for the IAAF Grand Prix track and field circuit, organised by the International Association of Athletics Federations. It was held on 5 September at the Luzhniki Stadium in Moscow, Russia.

Hicham El Guerrouj (1500 metres) and Marion Jones (100 metres and long jump) were the overall points winners of the tournament. A total of 18 athletics events were contested, ten for men and eight for women.

The event served as the final competition of the newly created 1998 IAAF Golden League. This was the only time that the Grand Prix Final served as the jackpot-deciding competition of that series.

Medal summary

Men

Women

References

Medalists
IAAF Grand Prix Final. GBR Athletics. Retrieved on 2015-01-17.

External links
IAAF Grand Prix Final archive from IAAF

Grand Prix Final
Grand Prix Final
International athletics competitions hosted by Russia
Sports competitions in Moscow
September 1998 sports events in Russia
1998 in Moscow
IAAF Grand Prix Final
Athletics in Moscow
IAAF Golden League